In Greek mythology, Ligeia or Ligia (Ancient Greek: Λίγεια means "clear-toned" from ligeios) may refer to two personages:

 Ligea, one of the 50 Nereids, sea-nymph daughters of the Old Man of the Sea, Nereus and the Oceanid Doris. She was one of the nymphs in the train of Cyrene. Ligeia was described to have bright, waving locks of hair and a slender pale neck.
 Ligeia, one of the Sirens. She was the daughter of the river-god Achelous and the Muse Melpomene or her sister Terpsichore. Ligeia's sisters were Parthenope and Leucosia or Thelxipeia and Peisinoe. She was found ashore of Terina in Bruttium (modern Calabria).

Notes

References 

 Gaius Julius Hyginus, Fabulae from The Myths of Hyginus translated and edited by Mary Grant. University of Kansas Publications in Humanistic Studies. Online version at the Topos Text Project.
John Tzetzes, Book of Histories, Book I translated by Ana Untila from the original Greek of T. Kiessling's edition of 1826. Online version at theio.com
 Lycophron, The Alexandra translated by Alexander William Mair. Loeb Classical Library Volume 129. London: William Heinemann, 1921. Online version at the Topos Text Project.
 Lycophron, Alexandra translated by A.W. Mair. London: William Heinemann; New York: G.P. Putnam's Sons. 1921. Greek text available at the Perseus Digital Library.
Publius Vergilius Maro, Bucolics, Aeneid, and Georgics of Vergil. J. B. Greenough. Boston. Ginn & Co. 1900. Online version at the Perseus Digital Library.

Nereids
Sirens (mythology)